Netherhill is a village in the Canadian province of Saskatchewan within the Rural Municipality of Kindersley No. 290 and Census Division No. 13. The village is located approximately 20 km east of the Town of Kindersley at the junction of Highway 7 and 658.

History 
Netherhill incorporated as a village on April 28, 1910.

Demographics 

Notable people

Bob Bourne, retired professional ice hockey left wing, played in the NHL between 1974 and 1988.

See also 

 List of communities in Saskatchewan
 Villages of Saskatchewan

References

Villages in Saskatchewan
Kindersley No. 290, Saskatchewan
Division No. 13, Saskatchewan